Kuraneh may refer to:

Kuraneh, Qazvin
Kuraneh, Baranduzchay-ye Jonubi, Urmia County, West Azerbaijan Province
Kuraneh, Silvaneh, Urmia County, West Azerbaijan Province
Kuraneh, Sumay-ye Beradust, Urmia County, West Azerbaijan Province